United States Army South is an Army service component command of United States Southern Command whose area of responsibility includes 31 countries and 15 areas of special sovereignty in Central and South America and the Caribbean. It is headquartered at Fort Sam Houston, Texas.

U.S. Army South's currently officially stated mission is to conduct and support multinational operations and security cooperation in the United States Southern Command area of responsibility in order to counter transnational threats and strengthen regional security in defense of the homeland. It may be still required to serve as a Joint Task Force Land Component Command or Joint Task Force, as directed.

Panama Canal Department

The Isthmian Canal Commission of 1904–1914 and the Panama Canal Guard both played a pivotal role in the construction and early defense of the Canal. The Panama Canal Guard was active from 1907 to 1917. On 1 July 1917, the Panama Canal Department was established as a separate geographic command with headquarters at Quarry Heights. Units included the 19th Brigade, composed of the 14th and 33rd Infantry, the 42nd Field Artillery, the 11th Engineers, and special troops.

In the late thirties, events in Europe and technological developments, such as the aircraft carrier and long-range bombers, precipitated construction of more modern defences, a network of roads, and Albrook Field. By 1939, the military strength in the Canal Zone was about 14,000 and by early 1940, the troop strength rose to almost 28,000. In January 1943, the troop strength peaked at just over 67,000, as the Coastal Defense Network grew to include machine guns, barrage balloons, and smoke machines protected the Canal's locks. Army aircraft patrolled the Caribbean Sea searching for enemy German submarines.

After the Second World War ended, the Panama Canal Department was re-designated the United States Army Caribbean on 15 November 1947, following inactivation of the Caribbean Defense Command and reorganization of the Army, Navy, and Air Force (now an independent service) in the Canal Zone under the newly activated United States Army Caribbean.

In December 1946, President Harry Truman approved a comprehensive system of military commands that put responsibility for military operations in various geographical areas in the hands of a single commander. Therefore, the United States Caribbean Command was established on 1 November 1947.

U.S. Army Caribbean 
On 15 November 1947, the Panama Canal Department became U.S. Army Caribbean (USARCARIB), headquartered at Fort Amador. One of its primary missions from 1951 to 1999, was the task of "keeping jungle warfare alive in the Army." Fort Sherman became the home for USARCARIB's Jungle Warfare Training Center (JWTC), which ran up to ten three-week courses per year. Many Soldiers destined for South Vietnam during the Vietnam War first received their jungle training at Fort Sherman.

Secretary of Defense Robert McNamara decided to bolster available U.S. Army forces in the Caribbean area in 1961, after the failed Bay of Pigs Invasion and rumours of Soviet assistance to Cuba. The Army reinforced the resident 1st Battle Group, 20th Infantry Regiment in the Panama Canal Zone with the 193d Infantry Brigade, which was activated on 8 August 1962.

On 6 June 1963, the United States Caribbean Command (the theater command) was re-designated as the United States Southern Command, to reflect primary responsibility in Central and South America, versus the Caribbean. Meanwhile, the United States Army Caribbean was re-designated the United States Army Forces Southern Command.

During the 1970s, the troop strengths averaged between 10,000 and 14,000 soldiers. Implementation of the Panama Canal Treaties of 1977 on 1 October 1979, brought with it the following changes: a new arrangement for the defense of the Panama Canal; the disestablishment of the Canal Zone; a change in designation for the brigade to 193rd Infantry Brigade (Panama), resulting in the beginning of the process of reorganizing from a heavy to a light infantry brigade; and a headquarters move from Fort Amador to Fort Clayton.

United States Army South from 1986
On 4 December 1986, the United States Army South was activated as a Major Army Command and the Army component of United States Southern Command, with headquarters at Building 95, Fort Clayton.

Operation Just Cause, the United States military action used to depose Panamanian dictator, General Manuel Antonio Noriega, was officially conducted from 20 December 1989 to 31 January 1990. United States Army South Headquarters became the headquarters for Joint Task Force-South, the headquarters designated to execute the operation. During the Panama Invasion the total troop numbers increased to 27,000. Of these, 13,000 were already stationed in Panama and 14,000 were flown in from the United States.

On 14 October 1994 the 193d Infantry Brigade was the first major unit to inactivate in accordance with the Panama Canal Treaty of 1977 which mandated U.S. Forces withdrawal from Panama by December 1999.

As part of a Unified Command Plan change, United States Southern Command also assumed geographic responsibility for U.S. military forces operating in the Caribbean Basin and the Gulf of Mexico on 1 June 1997. Within this framework, United States Army South's geographical area of responsibility expanded to now include today, 31 countries and 15 areas of special sovereignty in Latin America and the Caribbean, except Puerto Rico and Mexico. In 1998, United States Army South units participated in 15 platoon exchanges at the Jungle Operation Training Center with soldiers from Belize, Colombia, Venezuela, El Salvador, Chile, Argentina, and Paraguay.

As part of a larger Army transformation in response to the demands of post-9/11 operations worldwide, U.S. Army South merged with U.S. Army South (Sixth Army) on 16 July 2008, a change that expanded its size and capabilities to include an Operational Command Post (OCP) that could serve as the nucleus of a Joint Task Force (JTF) or Joint Forces Land Component Command (JFLCC) headquarters anywhere in the U.S. Southern Command Area of Responsibility. In addition, U.S. Army South incorporated the lineage and heraldry from Sixth U.S. Army. While U.S. Army South received an exception to policy from the Army Chief of Staff to retain its distinctive Spanish galleon insignia, its colors were merged with 6th Army's to mark the new, combined lineage and heraldry of the two historic organizations—one that played a pivotal role in the security of the Panama Canal and the broader region of Latin America and the Caribbean, and one that fought a series of famous battles in the Pacific theater of the Second World War.

Organization 
The organizational of the command in 2019 was as follows;

 United States Army South Headquarters and Headquarters Battalion, Fort Sam Houston, Texas
 470th Military Intelligence Brigade, Fort Sam Houston, Texas
 56th Signal Battalion, Fort Sam Houston, Texas
 Army Forces, Honduras (Joint Task Force Bravo), Soto Cano Air Base, Honduras
 Geospatial Planning Cell, 512th Engineer Detachment, Fort Sam Houston, Texas
 377th Theater Sustainment Command, New Orleans, Louisiana
 807th Deployment Support Medical Command, Fort Douglas, Utah
 525th Military Police Battalion, Guantanamo Bay Naval Base
 1st Battalion, 228th Aviation Regiment, Soto Cano Air Base

Commanders 

 MG Fred Woerner 1982-1986
 MG Taylor 1986-1987
 Major General Edward H. Brooks November 1947 – 1949
 Major General Bernard Loeffke April 1987 - March 1989
 Major General Marc Cisneros March 1989-1990 
 Brigadier General Kinzer 1990-1990
 Major General Hartzog 1990-1991
 MG Richard F. Timmons 1991-1993
 BG J. Wilson 1993-1993
 MG George A. Crocker 1993-1995
 MG Lawson W. Magruder III 1995-1997
 MG Philip R. Kensinger, Jr 1997-2000
 MG Alfred A. Valenzuela 2000-2003
 MG John D. Gardner 2003-2005
 MG PK Ken Keen 2005-2007

Notes

References
 Bennett, Ira Elbert (1915); History of the Panama Canal: its construction and builders. Washington, D.C.: Historical Publishing Company. OCLC 138568
 Williams, Antwan C., Lt. Col. (2012); Army South receives award for deployment, celebrates 100-year historical milestone. Fort Sam Houston, Texas: Defense and Fraternity Magazine.
 U.S. Army South Command Strategy published January 2013.

External links 

 
United States Army South entry at globalsecurity.org
U.S. Army South on Army.mil
U.S. Army South Official Command Magazine
U.S. Army South's Defense Video and Imagery Distribution Service (DVIDS) Page
 U.S. Army South Command Strategy

Military units and formations in Texas
South
Military units and formations established in 1986
Joint Base San Antonio